Presidential reorganization authority is a term used to refer to a major statutory power that has sometimes been temporarily extended by the United States Congress to the President of the United States. It permits the president to divide, consolidate, abolish, or create agencies of the U.S. federal government by presidential directive, subject to limited legislative oversight. First granted in 1932, presidential reorganization authority has been extended to nine presidents on 16 separate occasions. As of 2017, it was most recently granted to Ronald Reagan.

Presidential reorganization authority is designed to allow periodic refinement of the organizational efficiency of the government through significant and sweeping modifications to its architecture that might otherwise be too substantial to realistically implement through a parliamentary process.

Background

Overview
The customary method by which agencies of the United States government are created, abolished, consolidated, or divided is through an act of Congress. The presidential reorganization authority essentially delegates these powers to the president for a defined period of time, permitting the President to take those actions by decree. A method of limited oversight has generally been included in past cases of presidential reorganization authority; usually, reorganization plans issued pursuant to the authority can be nullified by an act of Congress during a fixed window of time following promulgation of the orders. In other words, should Congress take no action in response to an reorganization plan issued under the authority, then the plan becomes law. This is different from the normal process of lawmaking in which laws take effect with congressional action, not in the absence of action, and has been colloquially called the "legislative veto".

During World War II, special reorganization authority was granted to Franklin Roosevelt. However, these powers differed from what is generally considered to be presidential reorganization authority as all structural changes undertaken were to revert following the conclusion of the war.

Purpose
Presidential reorganization authority is designed to allow periodic refinement of the organizational efficiency of the government through significant and sweeping modifications to its architecture that might otherwise be too substantial to realistically implement through a parliamentary process.

Legal basis
The U.S. Constitution establishes an Executive Branch of government, It is, therefore, left to normal statute law to establish inferior offices and agencies, under the President, by which the government can operate.

Despite the broad authority granted by the United States Constitution to the president, he does not have "unilateral and unrestrained authority over the Executive Branch" and "congressional action is required to create Executive Branch departments, to fund them, to determine the nature and scope of their duties and to confirm the appointment of their top leaders". While the president manages the conduct of executive branch offices, "it is Congress, not the President, that establishes departments and agencies, and to whatever degree it chooses, the internal organization of agencies".

Delegation of legislative authority

The nondelegation doctrine is a principle that the Congress, being vested with "all legislative powers" by Article One, Section 1 of the United States Constitution, cannot delegate that power to anyone else.  However, the Supreme Court ruled in J. W. Hampton, Jr. & Co. v. United States (1928) that congressional delegation of legislative authority is an implied power of Congress that is constitutional so long as Congress provides an "intelligible principle" to guide the executive branch: "'In determining what Congress may do in seeking assistance from another branch, the extent and character of that assistance must be fixed according to common sense and the inherent necessities of the government co-ordination.' So long as Congress 'shall lay down by legislative act an intelligible principle to which the person or body authorized to [exercise the delegated authority] is directed to conform, such legislative action is not a forbidden delegation of legislative power.'"

Unicameral legislative veto
A unicameral legislative veto has been a feature of the oversight authority built into several instances of presidential reorganization authority. United States Attorney-General William D. Mitchell early expressed concern that the Economy Act of 1932, the first instance of presidential reorganization authority, was unconstitutional on the basis of it allowing the exercise of the so-called "legislative veto" by only one chamber of Congress. The act provided that either the Senate or the House of Representatives could annul an executive order issued by the president under the reorganization authority. In Mitchell's view, a single chamber of Congress was constitutionally incompetent to act by itself; the legislative power could only be exercised by the two chambers jointly, he argued. The question was not immediately tested in court. However, in the 1983 case of Immigration and Naturalization Service v. Chadha the U.S. Supreme Court essentially affirmed Mitchell's earlier opinion that a one-house legislative veto was unconstitutional. The decision in Immigration and Naturalization Service v. Chadha created the possibility that every previous reorganization was effectively null and void; to avoid the potential administrative chaos that might have ensued, Congress enacted legislation retroactively approving all previous reorganizations.

History
The creation of presidential reorganization authority was foreshadowed with the passage of the Overman Act in 1918, which allowed the president to consolidate government agencies, though abolishing any specific department was prohibited. First fully extended in 1932, presidential reorganization authority has been authorized on 16 occasions. The Reorganization Act of 1949 was the last full statute enacted from scratch until the Reorganization Act of 1977; reorganizations occurring between the 1949 and 1977 statutes took the form of amendment and extension of the 1949 law.

The Reorganization Act of 1939 defined the reorganization plan as its own kind of presidential directive. Previously, the delegated authority had been exercised using executive orders.

As of 2017, the last major reorganization of the government using presidential reorganization authority was during the administration of Dwight Eisenhower. All subsequent cases of the invocation of presidential reorganization authority has been to make more minor, corrective adjustments.

As discussed above, in 1983 in Immigration and Naturalization Service v. Chadha the U.S. Supreme Court ruled that the one-house legislative veto was unconstitutional, causing Congress the following year to enact legislation retroactively approving all previous reorganizations.

The last reorganization authority was passed by Congress in 1984, although there have been proposals to reinstate it since then.

In 2002 George W. Bush requested the president be granted permanent reorganization authority. No such authorization was extended.  Also in 2002, the National Commission on the Public Service proposed extending presidential reorganization authority to substantially restructure the executive branch which, it contended, had become incoherent in the level of overlapping jurisdiction and different management structures.

During the presidency of Barack Obama, Obama requested reorganization authority from Congress which he said he would use to restructure the Department of Commerce, followed by less specific modifications to other agencies. Under Obama's plan, the National Oceanic and Atmospheric Administration would have been transferred to the Department of the Interior while the rest of the Department of Commerce would be merged with the Small Business Administration and the Office of the U.S. Trade Representative, and renamed. The authorization was not granted.

List of reorganization acts

See also
 Imperial Presidency
 Separation of powers under the United States Constitution

Notes

References

Law of the United States
Presidency of the United States
United States presidential directives